Desdia Neva Egan (October 3, 1914 – January 19, 2011) was an American educator who served as the first First Lady of Alaska from the state's creation in 1959 to 1966, and again from 1970 to 1974. Egan was the wife of the state of Alaska's first governor, William Allen Egan, and the mother of former Juneau Mayor and Alaska State Senator Dennis Egan.

Biography

Early life
Egan was born Desdia Neva McKittrick on October 3, 1914, in Wilson, Kansas. She was the third of five children born to Joseph Leland McKittrick and Martha Desdia Alderson McKittrick. McKittrick worked at her family's grocery store to earn the tuition money to attend Kansas State College. She then transferred to the University of Wyoming, where her aunt was a faculty member, in Laramie, Wyoming.

McKittrick began her career teaching music in a public school in Glenrock, Wyoming, for two years. She was paid a salary of $1,000 USD annually. She moved to the Territory of Alaska from Wyoming in 1937. McKittrick sailed to Alaska on board a steamship called the Teachers Special, which brought teachers to Alaska to work in the territory during the winter. McKittrick moved to Valdez, Alaska, where she became one of just three new teachers hired for the Valdez school district that year for a one-year teaching assignment. She taught fourth through sixth grade, as well as music, in the Valdez public school system.

McKittrick soon met her future husband, William Allen Egan, in Valdez, and the couple married on November 16, 1940. William Egan was also elected to the Alaska Territorial House of Representatives in 1940. William and Neva also operated a small grocery store, the Valdez Supply.

References

1914 births
2011 deaths
Alaska Democrats
American educators
First Ladies and Gentlemen of Alaska
Kansas State University alumni
University of Wyoming alumni
People from Juneau, Alaska
People from Valdez, Alaska
People from Ellsworth County, Kansas
People from Converse County, Wyoming